High Energy is the twenty-eighth studio album by American girl group the Supremes, released in 1976 on the Motown label. The album is the first to feature Susaye Greene; former member of  Stevie Wonder's Wonderlove; and is notable for featuring the last Billboard Hot 100 Top 40 pop hit for the group, "I'm Gonna Let My Heart Do the Walking". Of their 1970s releases, High Energy is the second-highest charting album on the US Billboard 200, the first being Right On (1970). In Canada, High Energy is the highest-charting Supremes album since TCB (1968).

Overview
The penultimate studio album released by the group, the Supremes began recording High Energy in December 1975, when its lineup consisted of Scherrie Payne, Mary Wilson and Cindy Birdsong. Birdsong left the group in February 1976, and her replacement, Susaye Greene, was overdubbed onto two tracks, including "I'm Gonna Let My Heart Do the Walking". Greene also assumed lead vocal duties on the title track featuring Joe Sample on piano. Along with Meet The Supremes and Reflections, these are the only studio albums to include four members of the group rather than the usual three. (Let the Sunshine In and Cream of the Crop both had Florence Ballard appear on a previously recorded track for each album, though she had long been dismissed from the group).

Lead vocals on the other tracks were split between original group member Wilson and Payne. Wilson takes the lead on the album's ballads "Don't Let My Teardrops Bother You", "Till the Boat Sails Away" and "I Don't Want to Lose You" (a cover of The Spinners from 1975). Wilson and Payne split the lead duties on "You're What's Missing in My Life", opening up the dance numbers "I'm Gonna Let My Heart Do the Walking", "You Keep Me Moving On" and "Only You (Can Love Me Like You Love Me)" for Payne. In the US, the single reached number 40 on the Billboard Hot 100, marking the final Top 40 single release for the Supremes.

Alternate mixes of "High Energy" and of "Don't Let My Teardrops Bother You" appeared on the Supremes' The '70s Anthology compilation. "Room at the Top" was also recorded during the sessions, but Eddie Holland felt that the song didn't fit with the feel of the remainder of the album. This track also surfaced on The 70s Anthology. Scherrie Payne was the original lead vocalist on the title track "High Energy;" however her vocal take has yet to be found. Payne has also stated that Cindy Birdsong also recorded a lead vocal for "High Energy;" however her vocal has also yet to be found.
 
The entire album was released for the first time on CD on May 17, 2011, on the three-disc set, Let Yourself Go: The '70s Albums, Vol 2 – 1974–1977: The Final Sessions, which also includes the complete album in a different mix by Russ Terrana. The set also includes alternate versions, including; a Wilson-led version of "You’re What’s Missing In My Life", a Payne-led "You’re What’s Missing In My Life" and a Greene-led "I’m Gonna Let My Heart Do The Walking".

Critical reception

In a contemporary review Cashbox published:
'The Supremes have developed a strong reputation for being number one in the field of sweet soul music and "High Energy" only serves to strengthen and broaden that reputation. The album is a pleasing offering of disco. soul and balladry that should find a universal appeal within the r&b. pop and MOR markets. The immaculate production is a tribute to the work of Brian Holland the strings are full and clean — the entire rhythm section tight and punchy. Prime AM material includes the disco feel of "I'm Gonna Let My Heart Do The Walking" and "You're What's Missing In My Life." The Supremes' gentle touch with a ballad should not be overlooked. "Till The Boat Sails Away" is a case in point.'

In a contemporary review for Record World, Vince Aletti writes:
'The Supremes' "High Energy" (Motown) is their glossiest and most satisfying album in some time. Like The Temptations, the Supremes are usually referred to as an "institution," a euphemism for a group that has gone through multiple personnel changes. But the myth, the spirit and Mary Wilson remain and all feel a lot fresher under the direction of Brian Holland, who produced, and Eddie Holland, executive producer; it's almost like old times again. The prime cut, already on two top 10 lists this week (Tony Smith's from Barefoot Boy and Richie Kaczor's from the new Top Floor), is "I'm Gonna Let My Heart Do the Walkin," a sassy, exhilerating song that sounds like a natural single. The title cut, with its shimmering, slow instrumental build-up, is the album's show piece production number, a beautiful job, and three other upbeat cuts—"You're What's Missing in My Life", "Only You (Can Love Me Like You Love Me)" and "You Keep Me Moving On"—should be tested out too'

John Lowe of AllMusic, similarly writes, High Energy is, 'Perhaps the most vigorous (and best) album of their latter-day career', helped by Brian and Eddie Holland at 'the production helm', Scherrie Payne's establishment 'as the centerpiece of the group' and Susaye Greene's 'multi-octative-voiced [...] though producers used her voice more for coloration than for substance.' Lowe describes the album as 'sturdy' and 'dance-oriented [...] highlighted by the hard-driving dance hit "I'm Gonna Let My Heart Do the Walking," which became their last Top 40 hit in 1976.'

Commercial response
Cashbox published in their July 17, 1976 issue, 'The Supremes album “High Energy," and single, "I'm Gonna Let My Heart Do The Walking" are national break-outs, with tremendous sales claimed on the East Coast.'

Track listing

Side one

"High Energy" (Harold Beatty, Brian Holland, Edward Holland, Jr.) - 5:25 
"I'm Gonna Let My Heart Do the Walking" (Harold Beatty, Brian Holland, Edward Holland, Jr.) - 3:33 
"Only You (Can Love Me Like You Love Me)" (Harold Beatty, Brian Holland, Edward Holland, Jr.) - 3:04
"You Keep Me Moving On" (Brian Holland, Edward Holland, Jr., Richard Davis, Hugh Wyche) - 3:35

Side two
"Don't Let My Teardrops Bother You" (Brian Holland, Lamont Dozier, Edward Holland, Jr., Richard "Popcorn" Wylie) - 4:59 
"Till the Boat Sails Away" (Barry Payne, Harold Beatty, Brian Holland, Edward Holland, Jr.) - 4:33
 "I Don't Want To Lose You" (Thom Bell, Linda Creed) - 3:30
"You're What's Missing in My Life" (Harold Beatty, Brian Holland, Edward Holland, Jr.) - 3:56

Personnel
Scherrie Payne - lead ("I'm Gonna Let My Heart Do the Walking", "Only You (Can Love Me Like You Love Me)", "You Keep Me Moving On", "You're What's Missing in My Life")  and backing vocals
Mary Wilson - lead ("Don't Let My Teardrops Bother You", "Till the Boat Sails Away", "I Don't Want to Lose You", "You're What's Missing in My Life")  and backing vocals
Susaye Greene - lead ("High Energy", ad-libs on "I'm Gonna Let My Heart Do The Walking")  
Cindy Birdsong - backing vocals
Ben Benay, Melvin "Wah Wah" Ragin, Ray Parker Jr. - guitar
Henry Davis, Julius Wechter - bass
Clarence McDonald, Joe Sample, John Barnes - keyboards
James Gadson - drums
Eddie "Bongo" Brown - congas
Bob Zimmitti, Gary Coleman - percussion
Brian Holland - producer
Edward Holland, Jr. - executive producer
Dale Warren - arranger, conductor

Charts

Weekly charts

Year-end charts

References

1976 albums
The Supremes albums
Albums produced by Brian Holland
Albums produced by Edward Holland Jr.
Motown albums